Chelule Chepkorir Liza is a Kenyan politician  who currently sits in the National Assembly as the county woman representative for Nakuru County.

Between 2013 and 2017 she was a member of the Kenyan senate, and was elected as Nakuru's woman representative in the 2017 general election.
She will be re-elected come 2022

Election Results

References

Kenyan politicians
Members of the 12th Parliament of Kenya
Members of the 13th Parliament of Kenya